The Eritrea–Ethiopia border encompasses the roughly 1,033 km (641.9 mi) boundary between the two states. The former borders the Afar and Tigray regions of Ethiopia, while the latter borders four regions of Eritrea from a total of six.

History

Creation 

The modern border of Ethiopia and Eritrea rooted in the late 19th century, when the Italian shipping company claimed the northern end of Assab Bay in March 1870. The area was settled by the Ottoman Empire and Egypt and the Italians introduced to the area in 1880. Under Emperor Yohannes IV, the Hewett Treaty was signed between the British Empire and Ethiopia to free access the Massawa coast to Ethiopia in exchange of evacuating garrisons from Sudan, during the Mahdist War.

After the death of Yohannes, Italian General Oreste Baratieri occupied the highlands along with the Eritrean coast, and proclaimed Eritrea is one of Italy's colonies. On 2 May 1889, the Treaty of Wuchale was signed between Ethiopia under Emperor Menelik II and Italy that recognized the formation of Italian Eritrea. However, the Article 17 contradicted each version of Amharic and Italian languages, as well as the Italian ambition to incorporate Ethiopia as protectorate of Italy, while the Amharic version granted Ethiopia greater autonomy. This resulted the First Italo-Ethiopian War, a war in which Ethiopia won against Italian forces, and ended with Treaty of Addis Ababa in 1896. The Italians took territories beyond the Mareb-Belessa and May/Muni rivers while Menelik absorbed Tigray Province.

Cold War 

After the Italian occupation of Ethiopia and the Second World War, there were considerable dispute about the status of Eritrea. After the Italian communist victory over the 1946 Italian election, they wished it to be returned to Ethiopia and the Soviet Union also had similar idea, despite fruitless diplomatic effort. In 1952, the United Nations declared that Eritrea to be one of Ethiopian Provinces under Emperor Haile Selassie, and federated with Ethiopia, resulting Eritrean War of Independence among few armed separatist movements, such as the Eritrean Liberation Front (ELF) formed in 1958. In 1960s and 1970s, the armed movement of Eritrean continued offensive toward the Ethiopian government until 1974 coup d'état against Emperor Haile Selassie. In February 1980, the Eritrean People's Liberation Front (EPLF) declared war the on ELF, after which the ELF had secret negotiation with the Soviet Union.

Eritrean–Ethiopian War 

Under the Ethiopian Transitional Government, Eritrea seceded from Ethiopia following UN-sponsored referendum in 1993, resulted in 99.81% voting for independence. On 4 May 1993, Eritrea was officially recognized as state. In late 1997, there was skirmish between their borders. A border conflict was ignited no less than months between Eritrea and Ethiopia in Badme after the Eritrean mechanized force penetrated to the town, and fighting continued between Tigrayan militia and security police. An Eritrea–Ethiopia Claims Commission was founded to ensure territorial claims under UN Charter Article 51. At the end of the war, Ethiopia occupied about quarter of Eritrean territory.

Under premiership of Abiy Ahmed, the two countries restored their relations led to the 2018 Eritrea–Ethiopia Summit on 9 July. In this summit, Ethiopia stated that Badme would cede to Eritrea and resumption of their diplomatic relations.

See also 
 Eritrea–Ethiopia relations
 Geography of Eritrea
 Geography of Ethiopia

References

Borders of Eritrea
Borders of Ethiopia
 
International borders